The 1974 Spillers Greyhound Derby took place during June with the final being held on 29 June 1974 at White City Stadium.  
The winner was Jimsun and the winning owners Joe De Mulder and Miss Lesley Walker received £13,500. The competition was sponsored by the Spillers.

Final result 
At White City (over 525 yards):

Distances 
1¼, ½, head, 1, 2½ (lengths)
The distances between the greyhounds are in finishing order and shown in lengths. One length is equal to 0.08 of one second.

Competition Report
Patricias Hope returned for an attempt to win an unprecedented third Derby but he was up against the ante-post favourites that included Juvenile and Wood Lane winner Myrtown, Irish entries Ballymaclune and Lively Band and Laurels victors Black Banjo and Over Protected.

Black Banjo failed to progress from round one but Blackwater Champ, (the Pall Mall Stakes champion) and Jimsun recorded the best times of 28.53 & 28.54 respectively. In a very strong heat two of round two the dream of Patricias Hope ended with his connections retiring him with immediate effect. Myrtown, Jimsun, Blackwater Champ and Acomb Dot all won their heats and remained unbeaten.

The first semi-final saw Soft Light provide a shock when beating Jimsun by a length whilst Acomb Dot finished last. Blackwater Champ took heat two with Myrtown taking the third and the final qualifying place.

A crowd of 33,000 turned up to see the sports premier race and they watched the Irish hope Ballymaclune trap well and take an early lead. Favourite Blackwater Champ lost any chance after missing the break. Jimsun showed good early pace to overtake and impede Handy High when moving up to second place and then challenged along the back straight before going onto win by just over a length in 28.76sec. Myrtown finished well to take second place.

Quarter finals

Semi finals

See also
1974 UK & Ireland Greyhound Racing Year

References

Greyhound Derby
English Greyhound Derby
English Greyhound Derby
English Greyhound Derby